Korth Combat is a German high-end revolver produced by Korth GmbH chambered in .357 Magnum. Each revolver is custom made and costs over €3,000.

References

External links
Korth USA
 http://world.guns.ru/handguns/double-action-revolvers/de/korth-e.html

Revolvers of Germany
.357 Magnum firearms
.38 Special firearms
9mm Parabellum revolvers